Thesium is a genus of ant-loving beetles in the family Staphylinidae. There are at least two described species in Thesium.

Species
These two species belong to the genus Thesium:
 Thesium cavifrons (LeConte, 1863) i c g
 Thesium pearcei Park in Park, Wagner and Sanderson, 1976 i c g
Data sources: i = ITIS, c = Catalogue of Life, g = GBIF, b = Bugguide.net

References

Further reading

 
 
 
 
 
 
 
 
 
 

Pselaphinae